is a Japanese football player for FC Ryukyu.

Club statistics
Updated to 23 February 2016.

References

External links

Profile at FC Ryukyu

1992 births
Living people
Tokyo International University alumni
Association football people from Tokyo
Japanese footballers
J3 League players
FC Ryukyu players
Association football goalkeepers